Fredi Zimmermann is a West German slalom canoeist who competed from the late 1970s to the late 1980s. He won three bronze medals at the ICF Canoe Slalom World Championships, earning them in 1981 (C-1 team), 1985 (C-2) and 1987 (C-2 team).

References

German male canoeists
Living people
Year of birth missing (living people)
Medalists at the ICF Canoe Slalom World Championships